Cytherea is a 1924 American silent romantic drama film directed by George Fitzmaurice and starring Alma Rubens, Lewis Stone, Constance Bennett, and Norman Kerry. Based on the novel Cytherea, Goddess of Love, by Joseph Hergesheimer and was adapted for the screen by Frances Marion. Cytherea features
two dream sequences filmed in an early version of the Technicolor color film process. The film is also known as The Forbidden Way.

Plot
As described in a film magazine review, Lee Randon, forty years old and bored, sees his nephew Morris becoming infatuated with Mina Raff and reproaches him. Later, when Morris leaves his wife to go with Mina, contented housewife Fanny Randon, who has no patience with modern ideas like dancing or jazz entertainment, asks her husband to plead with the young woman to release his nephew so he can return to his wife. In carrying out the mission, Randon in turn becomes infatuated with Savina Grove, a married woman of deep passion which has been untouched until she meets Randon. Randon and Savina elope and go to Cuba. Ostracized by his infraction of society's laws, Randon is denied admittance to the home of his brother. Savina is taken ill and dies. Randon returns to his home, where he is welcomed back by his wife.

Cast

Production
The film was produced by Samuel Goldwyn Productions and released by Associated First National Pictures. Cytherea was the first Technicolor film made under artificial light, while previous Technicolor films were made outdoors under natural light.

Preservation
With no copies of Cytherea found in any film archives, it is a lost film.

See also
List of early color feature films
List of lost films

References

External links

 
 
Stills at silenthollywood.com

1924 films
1924 romantic drama films
1920s color films
American romantic drama films
American silent feature films
Films based on American novels
Films directed by George Fitzmaurice
Films shot in Los Angeles
Films shot in New York City
First National Pictures films
Samuel Goldwyn Productions films
Silent films in color
Lost American films
Films with screenplays by Frances Marion
1920s American films
Silent romantic drama films
Silent American drama films